The Shrinking Man, a 1956 novel
The Incredible Shrinking Man, 1957 film adaptation

See also
The Incredible Melting Man, a 1977 film
The Incredible Shrinking Woman, a 1981 film